The Floral Pavilion is a theatre in the seaside town of New Brighton, on the Wirral Peninsula in England.  Situated on the promenade overlooking the River Mersey, it presents a mix of comedy, music and children's shows including a Christmas pantomime.

The original theatre opened in 1913 as an open-air summer theatre within the Victoria Gardens. In 1925 it was covered by an iron and glass roof and during the mid-1960s it was largely rebuilt, with a full metal roof.

The theatre closed in 2007 and was demolished as part of the town's £60 million Neptune Project redevelopment plans.
The building was rebuilt to a new design and reopened in December 2008. The first act to perform at the venue after reopening was Ken Dodd, who has had a long association with the Floral Pavilion, making his first appearance in 1940.
As well as an enlarged theatre auditorium, seating over 800, the complex also provides for conference facilities and a large multi-purpose lounge area.

References

External links
 Official website: Floral Pavilion Theatre

Theatres in Merseyside
1913 establishments in England
New Brighton, Merseyside
Buildings and structures in the Metropolitan Borough of Wirral